The 1938 Centenary Gentlemen football team was an American football team that represented the Centenary College of Louisiana as a member of the Southern Intercollegiate Athletic Association during the 1938 college football season. In their fifth year under head coach Curtis Parker, the team compiled a 7–4 record.

Schedule

References

Centenary
Centenary Gentlemen football seasons
Centenary Gentlemen football